WSUN-TV, UHF analog channel 38, was a television station located in St. Petersburg, Florida, United States. Operating from 1953 to 1970, it was the first television station in the Tampa/St. Petersburg television market.

History

Early history
The station first signed on with a test pattern on May 3, 1953, with regular operations beginning on May 5. It was owned by the city of St. Petersburg, along with WSUN radio (620 AM, now WTWD at 910 AM). It was one of the first UHF television stations in the country. WSUN-TV's studios were located on the first floor of the St. Petersburg Pier, overlooking Tampa Bay. The facility was relatively small – measuring only 35 feet long and 46 feet wide – and had once been a trolley turnaround. This made the production of local programs rather difficult.

The station was originally operated as an independent station, although it held secondary affiliations with all four major networks of the time – CBS, NBC, ABC and DuMont—in part because microwave links for network programming only went as far as Tampa. During its first year of operation, channel 38 relied on film and kinescopes for prime time programming. Later in the fall of 1953, however, the area's main telephone provider, Peninsular Telephone (later owned by GTE), provided WSUN-TV with a private microwave link in time for the World Series, making it the first television station in the country to receive live programming via microwave relay. The station quickly secured a primary affiliation with CBS, while continuing to cherry-pick programming from NBC, ABC and DuMont. During the late 1950s, the station was also briefly affiliated with the NTA Film Network.

Due to protracted battles over the other two allocations for Tampa Bay – VHF channels 8 and 13, both licensed to Tampa – WSUN-TV was the only station in the Tampa Bay area for two years. The station's most popular local program during this time was Captain Mac, hosted by Burl McCarty. Channel 38 lost its monopoly in 1955. On February 14 of that year, WFLA-TV (channel 8) signed on and took the NBC affiliation. In April, WTVT (channel 13) signed on and took the CBS affiliation (now Fox-owned affiliate). WSUN-TV dropped its affiliation with the dying DuMont network shortly afterward, leaving it as a sole ABC affiliate. WTVT's debut hit WSUN-TV particularly hard, as many of the station's staffers bolted to channel 13. One of them was McCarty, triggering a legal battle over whether he or channel 38 owned the Captain Mac character. Ultimately, McCarty was allowed to take his character to WTVT, but not his uniform or the show's format. WSUN-TV was allowed to use the Captain Mac name as well. This strange situation prevailed for only six months, until McCarty returned to WSUN-TV and stayed there until his retirement in 1959.

Signal problems
Channel 38 struggled in the ratings for the next decade, as ABC was not on par ratings-wise with CBS and NBC at the time (and would not be until the 1970s). However, it faced an additional problem due to its location on the UHF band. Until the All-Channel Receiver Act went into effect in 1964, television set manufacturers were not required to include UHF tuning capability. Viewers had to buy an expensive converter to watch WSUN-TV, and even with one, picture quality was marginal at best. Also, UHF signals did not travel very far at the time, resulting in a considerably smaller coverage area compared to those of WFLA-TV and WTVT.

In hopes of getting a better signal, WSUN-TV tried to swap frequencies with Tampa Bay's new educational television station, WEDU, in the late 1950s. Under the proposed deal, WSUN-TV would have moved to channel 3, while WEDU would have moved to channel 38 and kept WSUN-TV's old equipment. However, WEDU turned down this proposal.

Battle for channel 10
Sometime in the late 1950s, the Federal Communications Commission announced it was adding a third VHF channel allocation to the Tampa Bay market – channel 10, in Largo, just north of St. Petersburg. WSUN-TV immediately jumped into the bidding for the new license, fearing the loss of ABC programming if another company got the license. After a protracted legal battle, the FCC awarded the channel 10 license to Rahall Communications in 1961. Shortly afterward, ABC decided to move its affiliation in Tampa Bay to the new channel 10, effective with the end of WSUN-TV's contract in 1965. WSUN-TV sued ABC to stop the switch but could not stop Rahall from putting channel 10 on the air as WLCY-TV (now WTSP) on July 18, 1965.

After another month of legal fighting, WLCY-TV was finally awarded the ABC affiliation by court order. Channel 10 officially joined ABC in a special ceremony on September 1, leaving WSUN-TV as an independent station.

Demise
The St. Petersburg city government soon realized it could not afford to buy an additional 19 hours of programming per day, and sold WSUN (AM) and WSUN-TV to Hy Levinson of Detroit, owner of that city's WCAR radio (now WDFN).

In 1968, just when the station was finding its niche again, it got a competitor in the form of WTOG (channel 44). The new station's owner, Hubbard Broadcasting, used its financial muscle to snap up most of the stronger syndicated programming. WSUN-TV limped along for two more years before finally going off the air on February 23, 1970; the station's owners cited that "the situation as to viewers and advertisers precludes continued operation at this time." A local legend in the Tampa Bay area has it that during its last few months on the air, the station only showed a close-up of a clock; however, the station was showing at least four hours of programming daily (generally from 5 to 9 p.m.) by the time the station folded, at least according to published newspaper schedules, which stations such as WSUN provided.

The channel 38 frequency remained dark for 21 years, until WTTA signed on the air in June 1991. That station operates under a different license from WSUN-TV.

References

External links
Big 13 – memorial site for WTVT, includes some historical information on WSUN-TV

Television channels and stations established in 1953
Television channels and stations disestablished in 1970
Defunct television stations in the United States
Mass media in St. Petersburg, Florida
1953 establishments in Florida
1970 disestablishments in Florida
SUN-TV